The 1986 Hawaii Rainbow Warriors football team represented the University of Hawaiʻi at Mānoa in the Western Athletic Conference during the 1986 NCAA Division I-A football season. In their tenth season under head coach Dick Tomey, the Rainbow Warriors compiled a 7–5 record.

Schedule

Personnel

References

Hawaii
Hawaii Rainbow Warriors football seasons
Hawaii Rainbow Warriors football